Supermodified is the fourth studio album by Brazilian electronic music producer Amon Tobin. It was released on 16 May 2000 by Ninja Tune.

Tobin's official website defined the title of the album as:
modification: the act of modifying, state of being modified; change made in vowel by mutation, graphic representation of this
super: on the top (of); over; beyond; besides; in addition; exceeding; going beyond; more

Release
Supermodified was released by the Ninja Tune label on 16 May 2000 in the United States and on 22 May 2000 in the United Kingdom. Two singles were issued from the album: "Slowly" on 1 May 2000 and "Four Ton Mantis" on 4 September 2000. Music videos were produced for both "Slowly" (directed by Ben Rivers and Jeremy Butler) and "Four Ton Mantis" (directed by Floria Sigismondi).

In 2012, Supermodified was awarded a double silver certification by the Independent Music Companies Association, signifying sales of at least 40,000 copies in Europe.

Critical reception

At Metacritic, which assigns a normalised rating out of 100 to reviews from professional publications, Supermodified received an average score of 85 based on eight reviews, indicating "universal acclaim". Pitchfork critic Taylor M. Clark found it more accessible than Tobin's previous albums, as well as more cohesive: "Everything just fits together so well, like Lego blocks making a castle." John Bush of AllMusic wrote that Tobin had "again made great strides in his production skills, and the range and greatness of this material serves as proof positive."

Use in film and television
 "Natureland", "Slowly" and "Get Your Snack On" were used in the movie coverage of the 2003 Gumball 3000 Rally.
 "Saboteur" was used in the 2003 remake of The Italian Job.
 "Slowly" was used in the 2006 film Candy, as well as ES footwear's film, "Menikmati".
 "Four Ton Mantis" was used in a commercial for "Death Note" on Adult Swim, Paul Rodriguez's "Forecast" skateboarding video for Mike Mo Capaldi's segment, a Molson M commercial. and a commercial for the Nissan Qashqai
 "Chocolate Lovely" has been used on Adult Swim's commercial bumps.
 "Get Your Snack On" and "Deo" were used in the 2005 anime "IGPX".
 "Deo" was used in a Coca-Cola commercial.
 "Natureland" was used on Channel 4's TV promotional spot for its Stanley Kubrick season.
 "Get Your Snack On" was used in season 8, episode 13 of American Dad!.
 "Get Your Snack On" and "Four Ton Mantis" have been used in various Toonami bumps.
 Like "Easy Muffin" from Bricolage (1997), "Four Ton Mantis" is not available on streaming services, possibly due to sample clearance issues.

Track listing

Notes
 The track order for the LP edition repositions "Chocolate Lovely" between "Keepin' It Steel (The Anvil Track)" and "Natureland".

Personnel
Credits are adapted from the album's liner notes.

 Amon Tobin – production
 Openmind – artwork, design
 Quadraceptor – beatboxing on "Precursor"
 She 1 – typography
 Haig Vartzbedian – recording on "Precursor"
 Voda – mastering

Charts

References

External links
 Supermodified at official Ninja Tune website (includes audio clips)
 
 

2000 albums
Amon Tobin albums
Ninja Tune albums